Jumbo Water Tower is a water tower at the Balkerne Gate in Colchester, Essex. Charles Clegg (c.1855-c.1904), the Borough Surveyor and Engineer, designed the structure. The tower is 40.1m tall overall and contains 1.2 million red bricks. The tower was nicknamed ’Jumbo’ after the London Zoo elephant as a term of derision in 1882 by Reverend John Irvine who was annoyed that the tower dwarfed his nearby rectory at St. Mary-at-the-Walls.

Construction took around 20 months and was completed in 1883. 1,200,000 bricks and 819 tons of stone and cement were used in the construction of the tower. The tank is constructed of cast-iron bolted panels and when it was in use could hold 1069 cubic metres (37,800 cubic ft) of water. It was claimed at the time to be the second largest water tower in England.

Inside the central pier are 157 steps to a cupola which at 35.37 metres (116 ft) above ground offers views a long way over Colchester and the surrounding area.

It was listed in 1971 and is at Grade II* on the National Heritage List for England.

After a century of service the water tower became superfluous to the water supply system and was sold off by Anglian Water in 1987. It has had multiple owners since. In 2001 after prolonged controversy permission was granted on appeal to replace the tank with a glass walled penthouse, but work on this never started and permission expired. In 2006 at the height of the UK property boom, Jumbo was sold at auction for £330,000 to a local developer. In 2008 a local charity, the Balkerne Tower Trust, was formed with the aim of restoring the Grade II* listed tower and making it a heritage attraction with guided public access.

In September 2011 a subsequent planning application to convert the tower into a penthouse, flats and restaurant was rejected by Colchester Borough Council by 7 votes to 5.  Further planning applications in 2013 were also refused,
 and the building was put up for sale in May 2014, selling for £190,000 at auction  to local poultry farmer Paul Flatman  A scheme devised by North Essex Heritage, a Building Preservation Trust to construct a restaurant, gift shop and heritage centre within the tower was set back in July 2018 when an application for a Heritage Lottery Fund grant was turned down.

In December 2021 the tower was leased by Paul Flatman to North Essex Heritage for a 150 year term. The Trust plans to adapt the tower to house a restaurant, visitor experience and historical interpretation space.

See also
Tower Hill Water Tower, a water tower of similar design in Ormskirk, Lancashire

References

External links

Balkerne Tower Trust
North Essex Heritage

Buildings and structures in Colchester (town)
Water towers in the United Kingdom
Grade II* listed buildings in Essex
Towers completed in 1883